The United States never had an organized territory named Ohio Territory.  This term may refer to:

Territory Northwest of the River Ohio, an organized incorporated territory of the United States in the Great Lakes region between 1787 and 1803
Ohio Country, a vaguely defined colonial/frontier region, roughly covering the lands between the upper Ohio River and the Illinois Country (prior to 1787)
loosely, the Ohio River Valley in colonial times
incorrectly or informally, lands within the boundary of the state of Ohio after statehood in 1803